The 2018 Trophée des Champions was the 23rd edition of the French super cup. The match was contested by the 2017–18 Ligue 1 and Coupe de France champions Paris Saint-Germain, and the runners-up of Ligue 1, Monaco. The match was played at the Shenzhen Universiade Sports Centre in Shenzhen, China.

The match was a rematch of the previous edition, in which PSG defeated Monaco 2–1.

Paris Saint-Germain won the match 4–0 for their sixth consecutive and eighth overall Trophée des Champions title.

Match

Details

See also
 2017–18 Ligue 1
 2017–18 Coupe de France

References

External links
  

2018
2018–19 in French football
2018 in Chinese football
International club association football competitions hosted by China
Paris Saint-Germain F.C. matches
AS Monaco FC matches
Sport in Shenzhen
August 2018 sports events in China
Sports competitions in Guangdong